Harry Kalven Jr. (September 11, 1914 – October 29, 1974) was an American jurist, regarded as one of the preeminent legal scholars of the 20th century. He was the Harry A. Bigelow Professor of Law at the University of Chicago Law School, having graduated from the College and the Law School.  Kalven coauthored, with Charles O. Gregory (and later Richard Epstein), a widely used textbook in the field of torts, Cases and Materials on Torts.  Kalven was also a leading scholar in the field of constitutional law, particularly in the area of the first amendment.  Kalven is the author of a number of seminal books and articles. Kalven is the coauthor of "The Contemporary Function of the Class Suit," one of the most heavily cited articles in the history of American law, and widely considered to be the foundation of the modern class action lawsuit.  He also co-authored a pioneering empirical study of The American Jury with his Chicago colleague Hans Zeisel.

He coined the term Heckler's veto.

He was chair of the committee that produced what became known as the "Kalven Report", a document outlining the University of Chicago's role "in political and social action."

Selected works
Harry Kalven Jr., A Worthy Tradition: Freedom of Speech in America. Harper and Row Publishers. New York, 1988. 
Harry Kalven Jr., The Negro and the First Amendment. The Ohio State University Press, 1965. 
Harry Kalven Jr, Report on the University's Role in Political and Social Action. University of Chicago Record Vol. 1, No. 1 November 11, 1967
Haryy Kalven Jr. and Walter Blum, The Uneasy Case for Progressive Taxation. University of Chicago Press, 1953
Harry Kalven Jr. and Hans Zeisel, The American Jury. Little Brown, 1965

References

1914 births
1974 deaths
American legal scholars
American legal writers
American political writers
University of Chicago Law School alumni
University of Chicago faculty
University of Chicago Law School faculty
Scholars of constitutional law
Scholars of tort law
20th-century American non-fiction writers
20th-century American male writers
American male non-fiction writers